Ma Zhengqi (born March 1959) is a retired Chinese politician. He served as deputy director of the State Administration for Industry and Commerce between 2013 and 2018 and deputy director of the State Administration for Market Regulation between 2018 and 2019. He was a member of the 18th CPC Central Committee and a member of the 13th Standing Committee of the Chinese People's Political Consultative Conference.

Early life and education 
Ma was born and raised in Yongchuan County, Sichuan. He graduated from Chongqing Normal University, majoring in Chinese language and literature.

Political career
Ma entered the workforce in October 1976 and joined the Communist Party of China in April 1977.

Beginning in 1976, he served in several posts in Yongchuan County, including public security member, director, and CPC party chief.

In May 1994, he was appointed the CPC party chief of Rongchang County, he remained in that position until April 1997, when he was transferred to Chongqing and appointed the deputy secretary-general of Chongqing Government.

He became the CPC party chief of Wanzhou District in June 2002, he was re-elected in January 2003.

Ma was elevated to the vice-mayor of Chongqing in January 2007, rising to executive vice-mayor in April 2010.

He was promoted to become the deputy director of the State Administration for Industry and Commerce in April 2013, a position he held until March 2018. In March 2018, he became deputy director of the State Administration for Market Regulation, serving in the post until his retirement in May 2019.

In the middle of 2013, during the Anti-Corruption Campaign of the Communist Party of China, a Chinese journalist Liu Hu accused him of corruption in real-name reporting, but the Chinese government protected him.  Lai Dong, a local official of Wanzhou District said to the reporter of Beijing Times, "Over the years, report hasn't been interrupted, but haven't got the result."

See also
List of members of the 11th National People's Congress
18th Central Committee of the Communist Party of China

References

1959 births
Living people
Central Party School of the Chinese Communist Party alumni
Chinese Communist Party politicians from Chongqing
People's Republic of China politicians from Chongqing
Political office-holders in Chongqing